Elias Panayiotis Gyftopoulos (July 4, 1927June 23, 2012) was a Greek-American engineer who contributed to thermodynamics both in its general formulation and its quantum foundations.

Gyftopoulos received an undergraduate degree in mechanical and electrical engineering in 1953 from the National Technical University of Athens, and a Doctor of Science degree in electrical engineering at the Massachusetts Institute of Technology in 1958. At MIT, he initially focused on nuclear reactor safety and control. After meeting professors George N. Hatsopoulos and Joseph H. Keenan, his interests moved towards thermodynamics, in an attempt to give a consistent and rigorous exposition, free of the logical flaws and the limitations commonly associated with this discipline: his contribution culminated with reference textbook which completely reformulates the foundations of the subject, offering a general non-statistical definition of entropy applicable to both macroscopic and microscopic systems, both in equilibrium and in non-equilibrium states, and providing strong background and deep understanding of many applications in energy engineering for modern graduate curricula. His research also pioneered the subject of quantum thermodynamics with an early effort to give a quantum basis to thermodynamics by means a physical theory unifying mechanics and thermodynamics.

Works 

 Elias P. Gyftopoulos complete collection of published scientific works

References

External links 
 Elias P. Gyftopoulos collected works and memorial tribute

Thermodynamicists
Greek emigrants to the United States
MIT School of Engineering faculty
National Technical University of Athens alumni
MIT School of Engineering alumni
1927 births
2012 deaths
People from Athens